Lok is a village in the western part of Dera Ismail Khan in Khyber-Pakhtunkhwa province of Pakistan. It is located at 31°46'59N 70°43'5E 169 metres (557 feet).

References

Populated places in Dera Ismail Khan District